Leadbetterella is a Gram-negative and strictly aerobic bacterial genus from the family of Spirsomaceae, with one known species (Leadbetterella byssophila).

References

Further reading 
 
 

Cytophagia
Bacteria genera
Monotypic bacteria genera